Amir Issaa also known as Amir or Meticcio (born 10 December 1978) is an Italian rapper. He is called Meticcio (Mestizo) because his father is from Egypt and his mother is Italian. He sang the title song of the soundtrack for the movie Scialla! .

Discography

Solo career

Albums
2004 - Naturale (with Mr. Phil)
2006 - Uomo di prestigio - Peak - FIMI: #69
2007 - Vita di prestigio
2008 - Paura di nessuno
2009 - Amir 2.0
2010 - Pronto al peggio
2011 - Red Carpet Music
2012 - Grandezza naturale
2014 – Ius Music
2019 – Livin' Proof

EP
2015 – Un quarto d'ora di celebrità
2016 – Abracadabra (as Amir Issaa)

Mixtape
2006 – Prestigio Click Bang vol. 1 (with Santo Trafficante)
2008 – Prestigio Click Bang vol. 2 (with Santo Trafficante)
2010 – Radio inossidabile vol. 1
2011 – Radio inossidabile vol. 2
2015 – Radio inossidabile vol. 3

Singles
2006 - "Shimi"(featuring Nefer) - Peak - FIMI: #34

With 2 Buoni Motivi
 2001 - Meglio tardi che mai

Collaborations
 2009 - Eurostreetz Global Tactics Volume 1 - Takeover (prod. by Spintec)
 2017 – Endi featuring Amir – Il ritratto del peccato (from Sognando ancora)

References

Italian rappers
Musicians from Rome
1978 births
Living people
Italian people of Egyptian descent